Almine Rech Ruiz-Picasso ( Rech) is a French art dealer and owner of the eponymous contemporary art gallery. The gallery has exhibition spaces in Paris, Brussels, London, New York and Shanghai. The gallery opened in 1997 in Paris.

Early life and education
Almine Rech was born in Paris to a Vietnamese-French mother and a French father, Georges Rech, who founded one of France's first ready-to-wear labels in the 1960s. She took up painting and drawing in high school and while at boarding school in Switzerland before studying art, cinema and literature at Faculté des lettres de Paris and the École du Louvre.

Career
Early in her career, Rech did provenance research for Parisian auction houses. By the mid-1980s she was married to her first husband, businessman Xavier de Froment, for six years and had started selling art, helping friends and clients part with modernist artworks from the likes of Pierre Bonnard, Kurt Schwitters, and Félix Vallotton.

Rech began her career as a gallerist with her second husband Cyrille Putman, the son of Andrée Putman, opening a gallery in the Marais in 1989 where they presented a single work by James Turrell, who did not have a European dealer at the time; Robert R. Littman, the director of Centro Cultural Arte Contemporaneo, a private museum in Mexico City, bought the work.

Alongside other galleries including Air de Paris and Galerie Perrotin, Rech opened her own gallery on Rue Louise Weiss in the 13th arrondissement in 1997, as part of a city-sponsored initiative. At the time, she worked with artists Ugo Rondinone, Joseph Kosuth, and other artists with minimalist and conceptual leanings, including John McCracken. 

In 2006, the gallery moved to a larger, two-story space in the Marais district, before launching its current space in rue de Turenne in 2013. In 2008, Rech opened a second gallery in Brussels. In 2014, she opened a  gallery in London, and added a  space  – in New York in 2016. In 2019, the gallery expanded to Shanghai, where it operates a  space in the Amber Building — a three-story former People's Bank of China warehouse at 27 Hu Qiu Road –, sharing the floor with Lisson Gallery. On the gallery's expansion, Rech has noted, 'Each step in expanding our platform has increased our ability to support and invest in a new generation of artists, which is a consideration at the very core of our gallery's DNA.'

In 2021, amid the COVID-19 pandemic in the United States, the gallery opened a  space next door to the Aspen Art Museum in Aspen.

Almine Rech represents numerous living artists, including:
 Allen Jones (since 2019)
 Jeff Koons (since 2009)
 Vaughn Spann (since 2019)
 Otis Kwame Kye Quaicoe (since 2021)

In addition, the gallery has managed various artist estates, including: 
 Günther Förg (until 2018)
 Antoni Tàpies (since 2019)

Other activities
 Drawing Center, Member of the Board of Directors (since 2019)

Recognition
Rech is a member of the Ordre des Arts et des Lettres.

Personal life
Since 1997, Rech has been married to Bernard Ruiz-Picasso. They have been living in Brussels since 2006 but also maintain apartments in Paris and New York as well as a French country estate inherited from Picasso called Boisgeloup.

Since 2002, Rech and Ruiz-Picasso have been serving as co-chairs of the Madrid-based Fundación Almine Y Bernard Ruiz-Picasso Para El Arte (FABA), which holds a collection of works by Pablo Picasso. FABA also supports some of the couple's favorite institutions, including Le Consortium in Dijon, France, Serpentine Galleries in London and the New Museum in New York. In 2012, Ruiz-Picasso and Rech opened up Boisgeloup, inviting Sean Scully (2019) and other artists to exhibit throughout the chateau and its grounds.

References 

École du Louvre alumni
French art dealers
Living people
Year of birth missing (living people)